Michael Dennis Everitt (born 16 January 1941) is an English former professional football player and manager. As a left back, Everitt made over 200 appearances in the Football League for Northampton Town and he later managed in the Football League, Africa and the Middle East.

Playing career

Arsenal 
A left back, Everitt began his career in the youth system at First Division club Arsenal and turned professional in February 1958. He made his professional debut in a 2–0 victory over Fulham on 15 April 1960 and scored his only goal for the club with the winner versus Preston North End on 23 August 1960. He made just 9 appearances for the Gunners and departed Highbury in February 1961.

Northampton Town 
Everitt dropped down to the Fourth Division to join high-flying Northampton Town for a £4,000 fee in February 1961. He helped the club to clinch promotion to the Third Division at the end of the 1960–61 season and was a part of the team that clinched two further promotions to secure First Division football for the first time in the club's history in 1965. The Cobblers' stay in the top flight was fleeting and with a second-successive relegation looking likely, Everitt left the County Ground in March 1967. In just over six years with Northampton, Everitt made 207 league appearances and scored 15 goals. For his contribution, Everitt was later named in the Northampton Town 'Team of the Century'.

Later years 
Everitt joined Second Division club Plymouth Argyle in March 1967, but made just 31 appearances during just over a year at Home Park, before ending his League career with a two-season spell at Third Division club Brighton & Hove Albion. In 1970, Everitt dropped into non-League football to end his career with Plymouth City and Wimbledon before retiring in 1973.

Managerial and coaching career 
Everitt began his managerial career as player-manager of Plymouth City in 1970, but his tenure was ended when the club folded midway through the 1971–72 season. He took over from long-serving Les Henley at Southern League Premier Division club Wimbledon in April 1971, but was unable to achieve better than two mid-table finishes before surprisingly moving up to the Football League when he was appointed as manager of newly relegated Fourth Division club Brentford in August 1973. Everitt narrowly avoided a finish in the re-election places at the end of the 1973–74 season, but was sacked by incoming chairman Dan Tana in January 1975. After a spell coaching at Leicester City, Everitt moved abroad and managed clubs in Egypt, Kuwait and Morocco. He had particular success with El Mokawloon, winning the 1982–83 Egyptian Premier League title and two African Cup Winners' Cups.

Honours

As a player 
Northampton Town
 Football League Second Division second-place promotion (1): 1964–65
 Football League Third Division (1): 1962–63
 Football League Fourth Division third-place promotion (1): 1960–61

As a manager 
El Mokawloon
 Egyptian Premier League (1): 1982–83
 African Cup Winners' Cup (2): 1982, 1983

Career statistics

References

External links
 

1941 births
Living people
English footballers
English football managers
Arsenal F.C. players
Northampton Town F.C. players
Plymouth Argyle F.C. players
Brighton & Hove Albion F.C. players
Wimbledon F.C. players
Wimbledon F.C. managers
Brentford F.C. managers
English Football League players
Southern Football League players
Southern Football League managers
English Football League managers
People from Clacton-on-Sea
Association football fullbacks
English expatriate football managers
English expatriate sportspeople in Egypt
English expatriate sportspeople in Kuwait
English expatriate sportspeople in Morocco
Expatriate football managers in Egypt
Expatriate football managers in Kuwait
Expatriate football managers in Morocco
Egyptian Premier League managers
Kuwait Premier League managers
Al-Shabab SC (Kuwait) managers
Al Mokawloon Al Arab SC managers
Al Ahly SC managers
Leicester City F.C. non-playing staff